The women's group all-around gymnastics event at the 2017 Summer Universiade from August 27 to 28 at the Taipei Nangang Exhibition Center, Hall 1, 4F in Taipei, Taiwan.

Squads 

*:Only participate 5 hoops.**:Only participate 3 balls & 2 ropes.

Final results

References 

Women's group all-around